Social Science Japan Journal (SSJJ) is a peer-reviewed scholarly journal covering Japan in social scientific perspective, semiannually published by Oxford University Press. SSJJ's editorial board is located at the Institute of Social Science, the University of Tokyo, and supported by the international advisory board members including Andrew Gordon (Harvard University), Carol Gluck (Columbia University), Jomo Kwame Sundaram (United Nations), and J. Victor Koschmann (Cornell University). SSJJ is listed in the Social Science Citation Index (SSCI), under the "Area Studies" category.

External links
Social Science Japan Journal

Publications established in 1998
Oxford University Press academic journals
Japanese studies journals